These are the results of the men's floor competition, one of eight events for male competitors in artistic gymnastics at the 1988 Summer Olympics in Seoul.  The qualification and final rounds took place on September 18, 20 and 24th at the Olympic Gymnastics Hall.

Results

Qualification

Eighty-seven gymnasts competed in the floor event during the compulsory and optional rounds on September 18 and 20.  The eight highest scoring gymnasts advanced to the final on September 24.  Each country was limited to two competitors in the final.  Half of the points earned by each gymnast during both the compulsory and optional rounds carried over to the final.  This constitutes the "prelim" score.

Final

References
Official Olympic Report
www.gymnasticsresults.com

Men's floor
Men's events at the 1988 Summer Olympics